Uzuntepe is a village in the Samsat District of Adıyaman Province in Turkey. The village had a population of 424 in 2021.

The hamlet of Ağaköy is attached to Uzuntepe.

History 
The village was visited by Carl Humann and Otto Puchstein in 1882 describing it as a "small, dirty Kurdish village" where no one spoke Turkish.

References

Villages in Samsat District
Kurdish settlements in Adıyaman Province